Probation is the suspension of all or part of a jail sentence.

Probation may also refer to:

 Future probation, a concept in Christian soteriology
 Academic probation, the warning period allowed students to reverse serious academic or behavioral decline
 Probation (workplace), a status given to new employees of a company or business
 Probation (NCAA), a possible sanction resulting from violating the rules of the National Collegiate Athletics Association
 Disciplinary probation
 Scholastic probation
 Probation (1932 film), an American Pre-Code film
 Probation (1960 film), a Soviet drama film
 Probation Journal, academic journal